Deanna Church is a scientist working in the areas of bioinformatics and genomics. She is known for her work on the human genome, "making the genome a friendlier place".

Life
Church graduated with a bachelor's degree from the University of Virginia in 1990. She received a doctorate in Genomics from  University of California, Irvine in 1997. Church describes her passion for bioinformatics as connected to her enjoyment of problem solving and being in a team that has direct impacts on people's medical care.

Work
Church worked for the National Center for Biotechnology Information (NCBI) from 1999 until 2013. While there, she headed NCBI's team in the Genome Reference Consortium, an international group focusing on refining data on the human genome. She was part of the group involved in releasing GRCh38, a build of the human genome that included centromere sequences for the first time.

In 2013, she joined Personalis as Senior Director of Genomics and Content where she worked towards improving bioinformatics for better analysis of the human genome.

In 2016, she joined 10x Genomics as Senior Director of Applications. Church has had over 35 publications in her career.

See also
Human genome project
Mouse Genome Informatics

References

21st-century American biologists
Human Genome Project scientists
Living people
American biotechnologists
American bioinformaticians
University of California, Irvine alumni
University of Virginia alumni
21st-century American economists
Year of birth missing (living people)